New York's 25th State Senate district is one of 63 districts in the New York State Senate. It has been represented by Democrat Jabari Brisport since 2021, succeeding fellow Democrat Velmanette Montgomery. District 25 is currently the most Democratic-leaning district in the Senate.

Geography
District 25 covers a stretch of eastern and north-central Brooklyn, including the neighborhoods of Fort Greene, Boerum Hill, Red Hook, Bedford-Stuyvesant, Sunset Park, Gowanus, and Park Slope.

The district overlaps with New York's 7th, 8th, 9th, and 10th congressional districts, and with the 43rd, 50th, 51st, 52nd, 54th, 55th, 56th, and 57th districts of the New York State Assembly.

Recent election results

2020

2018

2016

2014

2012

Federal results in District 25

References

25